Yanko Radanchev (born 23 April 1957) is a Bulgarian gymnast. He competed in eight events at the 1980 Summer Olympics.

References

1957 births
Living people
Bulgarian male artistic gymnasts
Olympic gymnasts of Bulgaria
Gymnasts at the 1980 Summer Olympics
Place of birth missing (living people)